is a Japanese manga artist, known for the manga Nura: Rise of the Yokai Clan, which has been adapted into an anime series. He has worked as an assistant on Hirohiko Araki's series Steel Ball Run. He ranked tenth on Nikkei Entertainment's 2011 list of most successful manga artists by sales since 2010.

Works

References

External links 
 

1980 births
Manga artists from Osaka Prefecture
Living people
People from Suita